Conifer is an unincorporated community in Jefferson County, Colorado, United States.  Conifer is located along U.S. Route 285 in the foothills west of Denver.

History
A post office called Conifer was established in 1894.  Some say the community was named after George Conifer, the proprietor of a local tavern, while others believe conifer trees near the original town site caused the name to be selected.

Geography
Conifer is located at  (39.5210995,-105.3052708).  A magnitude 3.1 tremor centered on Berrian Mountain about 1 mile north of Conifer occurred on November 1, 1981, at 8:03 p.m. MST.

Climate
Conifer has a subarctic climate (Koppen: Dfc) with a yearly temperature average of 38.6°F (3.7°C). Summertime is warm with cool nights, while winter is chilly with nights approaching zero.

Landmarks
The Clifton House Inn, Jefferson County Register of Historic Places
Conifer Junction Schoolhouse, National Register of Historic Places
The Conley Coffee Shop, Jefferson County Register of Historic Places
The Lubin-Blakeslee Place at Meyer Ranch, Conifer, Jefferson County Register of Historic Places
Midway House at Meyers Ranch, built 1889, National Register of Historic Places 5JF.303
Original Elk Creek Fire House, Jefferson County Register of Historic Places
Pleasant Park School, built 1894, Colorado Register of Historic Places 5JF.972
Yellow Barn at Bradford Junction, built 1918, Jefferson County Register of Historic Places
Coney Island Hot Dog Stand for many years it was in Aspen Park area of Conifer, but was moved to the nearby community of Bailey.
Staunton State Park - 3,908-acre state park located 6 miles west of Conifer

Education
Students living within Jefferson County attend Jefferson County schools. Those neighborhood schools are Elk Creek Elementary School, West Jefferson Elementary School, Marshdale Elementary School, West Jefferson Middle School, and Conifer High School.
In 2011, Conifer High School was ranked 434 in the top 500 schools in the nation by Newsweek.

Infrastructure
Conifer residents are served by the Elk Creek Fire Protection District, a mixed career/volunteer fire department with approximately 60 active duty firefighters.

Notable people
 Amy Bruckner, American actress.
 Trey Parker, South Park co-creator grew up in the area
 Blaine Sumner, World Record holder powerlifter.

See also
Denver-Aurora Metropolitan Statistical Area
Denver-Aurora-Boulder Combined Statistical Area
Front Range Urban Corridor
List of cities and towns in Colorado

References

External links
 Conifer Chamber of Commerce

Unincorporated communities in Jefferson County, Colorado
Unincorporated communities in Colorado
Denver metropolitan area